Dianthus rupicola is a species of Dianthus native to Sicily and nearby areas of mainland Italy. It tends to grow in a few populations on steep cliffs, and consequently is viewed as at risk from climate change.

Subspecies
A number of subspecies have been described:

Dianthus rupicola subsp. aeolicus (Lojac.) Brullo & Miniss.
Dianthus rupicola subsp. bocchoriana L.Llorens & Gradaille
Dianthus rupicola subsp. hermaeensis (Coss.) O.Bolòs & Vigo
Dianthus rupicola subsp. lopadusanus Brullo & Miniss.

References

rupicola
Endemic flora of Italy
Plants described in 1806